George Williamson (13 September 1925 – 1994)  was an English professional footballer who played as a wing half.

Career
Born in Newcastle upon Tyne, Williamson played for Middlesbrough, Chester, Bradford City, and Colwyn Bay.

He signed for Bradford City in June 1950 from Chester, and left for Colwyn Bay in July 1957. During his time with Bradford City he scored 31 goals in 223 league appearances, as well as two goals in 12 games in the FA Cup.

Sources

References

1925 births
1994 deaths
English footballers
Middlesbrough F.C. players
Chester City F.C. players
Bradford City A.F.C. players
Colwyn Bay F.C. players
English Football League players
Association football wing halves